Kéné Ndoye (20 November 1978 – 13 February 2023) was a Senegalese track and field athlete, competing internationally for Senegal. She was 14th in the triple jump at the 2004 Olympic Games in Athens, Greece.

She won Senegal's first world indoor medal when she took bronze in the triple jump at the 2003 World Indoor Championships. She was also successful in the African Championships in Athletics where she won ten medals in athletics (three Gold, three Silver and four Bronze). She had three All Africa Games Medals (one Gold, two Bronze) and won the Golden Lion as Senegal's top sports person for 2003. She was a scholarship holder with the Olympic Solidarity program from November 2002. Kéné Ndoye died February 13, 2023 at the age of 44.

International competitions

References

External links

World Indoor Championships

1978 births
2023 deaths
Senegalese triple jumpers
Female triple jumpers
Senegalese female athletes
Olympic athletes of Senegal
Athletes (track and field) at the 2000 Summer Olympics
Athletes (track and field) at the 2004 Summer Olympics
African Games gold medalists for Senegal
African Games medalists in athletics (track and field)
Athletes (track and field) at the 1999 All-Africa Games
Athletes (track and field) at the 2003 All-Africa Games
Athletes (track and field) at the 2011 All-Africa Games